Briggs is an unincorporated community in eastern Burnet County, Texas, United States. It lies along U.S. Route 183 and FM 2657 northeast of Burnet.  Its elevation is 1,102 feet (336 m), and it is located at  (30.8896255, -97.9250199).  Although Briggs is unincorporated, it has a post office, with the ZIP code of 78608; the ZCTA for ZIP Code 78608 had a population of 279 at the 2000 census.

Founded as Springs, the community was soon renamed Gum Springs.  The first settler in the area, a Missourian named W. T. Gann, arrived in the area in 1855, but the community was established along the Berry Creek in the last quarter of the nineteenth century.  A post office was established under the name of Taylor's Gin (named for leading settler Stephen Taylor) on 27 March 1888; it did not assume its current name until 21 June 1898, when local doctor William Hazelwood was able to have the community renamed for his mother-in-law.  The community prospered in the early 1900s; although major fires and the early effects of the Great Depression seriously impacted the community, it reached its zenith in population of just over five hundred in 1936, from which it has since declined to its present level of an estimated ninety residents.

Firefly Aerospace operates a test and production facility in the community.

Climate
The climate in this area is characterized by hot, humid summers and generally mild to cool winters.  According to the Köppen Climate Classification system, Briggs has a humid subtropical climate, abbreviated "Cfa" on climate maps.

References

External links
Profile of Briggs from the Handbook of Texas Online

Unincorporated communities in Burnet County, Texas
Unincorporated communities in Texas
Populated places established in 1855
1855 establishments in Texas